Goran Volarević (born 2 April 1977) is a Croatian and Italian male water polo player. He was a member of the Croatia men's national water polo team, playing as a goalkeeper. He was a part of the team at the 2004 Summer Olympics. On club level he played for VK Jug Dubrovnik in Croatia.

See also
 Croatia men's Olympic water polo team records and statistics
 List of men's Olympic water polo tournament goalkeepers
 List of sportspeople who competed for more than one nation

References

External links
 

1977 births
Living people
Croatian male water polo players
Water polo goalkeepers
Water polo players at the 2004 Summer Olympics
Olympic water polo players of Croatia
People from Pula
Italian male water polo players